Trapping the queen is a tactical motif which occurs in both amateur and master games. The tactic is similar to a mating net, whose target is the defender's king, rather than his queen. When the opponent's queen is successfully trapped, it usually results in his immediate resignation.

Examples

The diagram on the right shows a position from the game Alekhine-Rubinstein, San Remo 1930. White plays for trapping the queen, as after the moves (1Nxd5 cxd5 2.bc7), Black's queen is lost. In the game, Black did not take the knight and after the sequence (1. Nxd5 Bd6 2.Bxd6 Nxd6 3.Nf4), simply lost a pawn without compensation.

A more complex position, shown in the second diagram originates from the game Liberman-Ioffe, URS, 1961. After the move 1.Ne6 Bf8 (forced, since 1...Bxe6 loses the queen to 2.Bxc6+ bxc6 3.Qxa5). After the moves (1.Ne6 Bf8 2.b4 Nxb4 (forced, otherwise the queen is trapped) 3.Bxd7+Kxd7 4.Qxa5 (and the Black queen is lost anyway)

The position shown in the third diagram on the right originates from the game Nezhmetdinov-Konstantinov, Rostov, 1936, after the moves (1.e4 e6 2.d4 d5 3.e5 c5 4.dxc5Bxc5 5.Bd3 Nc6 6.Qe2 Qc7 7.Nf3 Nd4 8.Nxd4 Bxd4 9.f4 Ne7 10.Na3 a6 11.c3 Bxc3+ 12.bxc3 Qxc3+ 13.Qd2). When one of the strongest tactical geniuses of all time, Rashid Nezhmetdinov leaves a rook hanging, it may be advisable to proceed with caution. However, in the game Black took the rook and after 2.Bb1 he resigned, since the Black queen is trapped and will be lost after 3.Bb2

References 

Chess tactics